This is a list of number one-albums of the Irish Independent Albums Chart.

List of Irish Independent Albums Chart number ones of 2010
List of Irish Independent Albums Chart number ones of 2011
List of Irish Independent Albums Chart number ones of 2012
List of Irish Independent Albums Chart number ones of 2013
List of Irish Independent Albums Chart number ones of 2014
List of Irish Independent Albums Chart number ones of 2015
List of Irish Independent Albums Chart number ones of 2016
List of Irish Independent Albums Chart number ones of 2017
List of Irish Independent Albums Chart number ones of 2018
List of Irish Independent Albums Chart number ones of 2019
List of Irish Independent Albums Chart number ones of 2020
List of Irish Independent Albums Chart number ones of 2021
List of Irish Independent Albums Chart number ones of 2022
List of Irish Independent Albums Chart number ones of 2023

See also
List of number-one albums (Ireland)

External links
Top 20 Indie Individual Artist Albums at IRMA
Top 10 Independent Artist Albums at Chart-Track

Independent